In motorsport, the racing setup, car setup or vehicle setup is the set of adjustments made to the vehicle in order to optimize its behaviour (performance, handling, reliability, etc.) for specific conditions. Vehicle setups are variable for a variety of reasons, ranging from weather, driver/rider preference and race track characteristics. Contrary to common misperceptions, setup is not used to maximize the performance of the engine, but to optimize it for the track at which it is being used. For example, motorcycle racers frequently detune their engines to reduce performance and power output so as to ensure the bike accelerates in a predictable manner.

Usually adjustable vehicle parts include shock absorbers and anti-roll bar (suspension), gear ratios and differential, tyre pressures and type, wing angles, wheel toe and camber angle, brake bias, steering lock and ride height.

Aftermarket modifications and adjustments to affect handling 

The following trends will apply in most cases, but there can be exceptions to some of these. Generally changes should be made one at a time, in small steps. Adjusting to gain in one characteristic will often will often be at the expense of another characteristic.

In addition, lowering the centre of gravity will always help the handling (as well as reduce the chance of roll-over).  This can be done to some extent by using plastic windows (or none) and light roof, hood (bonnet) and boot (trunk) lid materials, by reducing the ground clearance, etc.  Increasing the track with "reversed" wheels will have a similar effect, but remember that the wider the car the less spare room it has on the road and the farther you may have to swerve to miss an obstacle. Stiffer springs and/or shocks, both front and rear, will generally improve handling, at the expense of comfort on small bumps.  Performance suspension kits are available. Light alloy (mostly aluminium or magnesium) wheels improve handling and ride as well as appearance.

The car's roll centre is the other fundamental piece of the equation. Care must be taken to avoid lowering the centre of gravity past the car's roll centre. The distance between the car's centre of gravity and its roll centre is known as the roll couple, or the length that the car rolls around. Ideally, if the roll centre and the centre of gravity occupy the same space, the car should exhibit zero body roll.

Moment of inertia can be reduced by reducing weight, usually results from using lighter bumpers and wings (fenders), or none at all.

See also
Car handling
Car tuning, the hobby of modifying a car
Coil bind
Oversteer
Understeer
Vehicle dynamics
Inerter (mechanical networks)

References

External links
 Setup Matrix (for virtual racing)
Physics of Racing Series
The "ULTIMATE" Racing Car Chassis Setup Guide and Tutorial
Building a setup for Grand Prix Legends

Motorsport terminology